Darren Childs  is a British business executive. Childs was recently the chief executive officer at Premiership Rugby.

He was born in Doncaster in 1966 and studied Computer Science and later Business at Stanford.

He serves on the board of the Kyriakou family owned Antenna Group. a diversified media business with investments in high-profile US digital companies as well as European Pay TV, Broadcasting, and Radio.

He joined the Board of Nordic Capital owned global software business VIZRT in 2018.

UKTV has been transformed since the acquisition of 50% of the business by US media company Scripps in 2011 with focus on growth, performance, operational efficiency, content production and creation and digital transformation for which UKTV has received major awards for its channels, original content and digital services.

He has delivered many speeches on the subject including keynotes for the Economist and Financial Times. He is featured on the Corporate Rebels coveted Bucket List 

On 7 February 2019, it was announced that Childs had decided to step down as CEO of UKTV after eight years at the helm.  In June 2019 he become CEO of Premiership Rugby. At the end of the 2021 season it was announced that Childs stepped down from the role of CEO of Premiership Rugby to take up an advisory role at CVC Capital Partners. and to focus on his other Board positions.

Previous career 
Childs has held several senior executive positions in international media.

He moved to Hong Kong in the early 1990s as part of the launch teams for Star TV, then owned by "Li Ka-shing" (CK Hutchinson Holdings) and later acquired by News Corp in 1994, and spent eight years building the business across Asia.  He moved back to London joining Sony Pictures/Columbia Tri-Star  as Senior Vice-president for Europe.

He is credited for investing in, and then being on the board of HBO in Europe and VIVA in Germany.  

He joined BBC Worldwide Board in 2010 to prepare the business for IPO and separation from the BBC and resigned when IPO plans were cancelled by the incoming Chairman of the BBC Trust.

Recent articles written by Childs 

https://www.standard.co.uk/business/darren-childs-tv-needs-more-apprenticeships-to-rid-industry-of-richkid-privilege-to-land-the-best-a3101336.html

The Economist 

Insigniam Quarterly

Other interests 

 Member of the London Business School E100 angel investment group, investing in digital and disruptive start up companies.

Recent press article
http://www.director.co.uk/6709-darren-childs-uktv-cover-interview/

http://www.thetimes.co.uk/tto/business/industries/leisure/article4731197.ece

https://www.telegraph.co.uk/business/2016/04/17/uktv-boss-its-easier-being-the-challenger/

http://insigniamquarterly.com/2013/12/02/profiles-in-disruptive-leadership/

https://www.theguardian.com/media/2013/sep/08/uktv-dave-repeats-dynamo

http://m.broadcastnow.co.uk/5100892.article

https://www.eiuperspectives.economist.com/node/12589

https://www.independent.co.uk/news/business/analysis-and-features/uktv-boss-wants-to-get-your-attention-8122357.html

British television executives
1966 births
Living people
People from Doncaster